Kalenahalli Adaviswamy Dhananjaya (born 23 August 1986), also known as Daali, is an Indian actor, lyricist and film producer known for his work in Kannada cinema. He made his acting debut in Director's Special in 2013 for which he won the best debut actor award at the 3rd SIIMA Awards. He turned producer through the film, Badava Rascal. He has also occasionally penned columns for leading Kannada newspapers.

Dhananjaya got the major breakthrough in the film Tagaru (2018) directed by Duniya Soori for his performance as a menacing villain. He is now popularly addressed as Daali - the character name in the film. Dhananjaya has also played roles in films in other languages such as Telugu and Tamil.

Early life and family
Dhananjaya was born on 23 August 1986. Dhananjaya excelled in studies and had secured top marks for the whole of Hassan District once when he was in 7th standard and then again in 10th standard. He says he grew up watching Dr. Rajkumar movies and hence he started acting in dramas, mono-acting competitions and street plays while he was still in school.

Dhananjaya then moved to Mysore for higher studies and having completed his PUC in Marimallappa College, he secured an engineering seat in one of the reputed engineering colleges in Mysore, SJCE. He even got a job in a software company, Infosys. However, he started taking acting more seriously and joined an amateur theatre group called GPIER which was headed and mentored by a senior Rangayana artist named Mime Ramesh. He was also recognized and mentored by Germany theatre artist Christian Stückl in Germany. During one of his performances in a drama, he was recognised by popular Kannada director Guruprasad and was offered a lead role in a feature film. Thus began his career in Sandalwood.

Film career

Early years (2013–2018) 
Dhananjaya appeared in a Kannada short film on YouTube called Jayanagar 4th Block which has over 2.5 million views as of 2022. Dhananjaya was offered a lead role in Guruprasad's feature film Director's Special. The film took three years in the making and was finally released in 2013 to mixed and negative responses at the box office. Dhananjaya was lauded for his performance and won the best debut actor award at the 3rd SIIMA Awards for the same. Many prominent filmmakers approached him for the roles in their films. He was then cast in A. P. Arjun's next film Rhaatee opposite Shruthi Hariharan under musician V. Harikrishna's debut production. His next was Preetham Gubbi's film Boxer, produced under Jayanna Films banner, which brought him wide accolades. He was known for his fit boxer's body, which he had achieved by rigorous training. He was then offered a role by National award-winning director T. S. Nagabharana for the film Allama which is based on the life of 12th century saint poet Allama Prabhu. Dhananjaya underwent harsh training to master the musical instrument Mridanga and also the classical dance for the role and received great reviews for his performance. Although his movies did not make a big impact on the box office collection, he constantly received good reviews from the audience and critics for his acting skills.

Daali and after (2018–present) 
His biggest breakthrough came when he was offered a negative role named "'Daali" opposite Shiva Rajkumar In Tagaru directed by Duniya Suri. Director Suri has shared that he was a bit hesitant to offer negative role to Dhananjaya as he was always playing good deed doing lead (or hero) roles in his previous movies and was pleasantly surprised when he accepted the offer. The film opened with very good reviews and was declared a huge hit in terms of box office collection. Dhananjaya's acting as a menacing villain won him accolades across the film fraternity, critics and the audience. The role earned him nicknames such as "Nataraakshasa", "Nata bhayanakara", "Daali" etc.,. He is currently one of the most sought-after actors who is seen as a capable lead to play both antagonist and protagonist roles. After this movie, he has played many roles with leading actors in the Kannada film industry such as Darshan in Yajamana, Puneeth Rajkumar in Yuvarathna and Duniya Vijay in Salaga as well as paving the way to receive offers for films in other languages.

Producer, lyricist and a writer & Director 
Riding on the success of his acting career in Sandalwood, Dhananjaya has set up his own production house Daali Pictures named after his popular character Daali. Badava Rascal - A Kannada film, will be marking Dhananjaya's entry into the journey as a producer under his home banner. The film has the production part and is due for release soon. According to recent announcements Dhananjaya is set to produce second film named Head Bush under his home banner Daali Pictures. The film based on the life-story of Bangalore's infamous underworld don - Jayaraj.

Dhananjaya has also penned for songs in movies that he has starred in as well as other indie films. The upcoming Kannada film named Orchestra - a first production venture by musician Raghu Dixit being one of his first as a lyricist in Kannada film industry. He has also written multiple songs for his upcoming movie Badava Rascal among which one of them was released recently and was a huge hit.

Dhananjaya often writes columns in Kannada newspapers choosing topics such as social issues and human values.

Filmography 

All films are in Kannada unless noted otherwise.

As actor

As lyricist

As producer

Awards

References

External links 

 
 Dhananjay Rediff interview

Living people
1986 births
Indian male film actors
Indian male stage actors
Male actors from Karnataka
Male actors in Kannada cinema
People from Hassan district
21st-century Indian male actors
Male actors in Kannada theatre
South Indian International Movie Awards winners
Male actors in Telugu cinema